Sir Pushpinder Singh Saini (born 26 February 1968) is a British High Court judge.  

Saini was born in Nairobi, Kenya and educated at Dormers Wells High School in Southall and attended Corpus Christi College, Oxford, completing a BA and the postgraduate BCL, graduating with a first on both.  

He was called to the bar at Gray's Inn in 1991 and practised from Blackstone Chambers. He took silk in 2008 and was appointed a deputy High Court judge in 2017. 

On 1 October 2019, Saini was appointed a judge of the High Court and assigned to the Queen's Bench Division. He took the customary knighthood in the same year. 

In 1996, he married Gemma White with whom he has a son and a daughter.

References 

Living people
1968 births
21st-century English judges
Knights Bachelor
English Sikhs
Alumni of Corpus Christi College, Oxford
Members of Gray's Inn
Queen's Bench Division judges
People from Nairobi
English King's Counsel
21st-century King's Counsel